The arrondissement of Valenciennes is an arrondissement of France in the Nord department in the Hauts-de-France region. It has 82 communes.

Composition

The communes of the arrondissement of Valenciennes, and their INSEE codes, are:

 Abscon (59002)
 Anzin (59014)
 Artres (59019)
 Aubry-du-Hainaut (59027)
 Aulnoy-lez-Valenciennes (59032)
 Avesnes-le-Sec (59038)
 Bellaing (59064)
 Beuvrages (59079)
 Bouchain (59092)
 Bousignies (59100)
 Brillon (59109)
 Bruay-sur-l'Escaut (59112)
 Bruille-Saint-Amand (59114)
 Château-l'Abbaye (59144)
 Condé-sur-l'Escaut (59153)
 Crespin (59160)
 Curgies (59166)
 Denain (59172)
 Douchy-les-Mines (59179)
 Émerchicourt (59192)
 Escaudain (59205)
 Escautpont (59207)
 Estreux (59215)
 Famars (59221)
 Flines-lès-Mortagne (59238)
 Fresnes-sur-Escaut (59253)
 Hasnon (59284)
 Haspres (59285)
 Haulchin (59288)
 Haveluy (59292)
 Hélesmes (59297)
 Hergnies (59301)
 Hérin (59302)
 Hordain (59313)
 Lecelles (59335)
 Lieu-Saint-Amand (59348)
 Lourches (59361)
 Maing (59369)
 Marly (59383)
 Marquette-en-Ostrevant (59387)
 Mastaing (59391)
 Maulde (59393)
 Millonfosse (59403)
 Monchaux-sur-Écaillon (59407)
 Mortagne-du-Nord (59418)
 Neuville-sur-Escaut (59429)
 Nivelle (59434)
 Noyelles-sur-Selle (59440)
 Odomez (59444)
 Oisy (59446)
 Onnaing (59447)
 Petite-Forêt (59459)
 Préseau (59471)
 Prouvy (59475)
 Quarouble (59479)
 Quérénaing (59480)
 Quiévrechain (59484)
 Raismes (59491)
 Rœulx (59504)
 Rombies-et-Marchipont (59505)
 Rosult (59511)
 Rouvignies (59515)
 Rumegies (59519)
 Saint-Amand-les-Eaux (59526)
 Saint-Aybert (59530)
 Saint-Saulve (59544)
 Sars-et-Rosières (59554)
 Saultain (59557)
 Sebourg (59559)
 La Sentinelle (59564)
 Thiant (59589)
 Thivencelle (59591)
 Thun-Saint-Amand (59594)
 Trith-Saint-Léger (59603)
 Valenciennes (59606)
 Verchain-Maugré (59610)
 Vicq (59613)
 Vieux-Condé (59616)
 Wallers (59632)
 Wasnes-au-Bac (59645)
 Wavrechain-sous-Denain (59651)
 Wavrechain-sous-Faulx (59652)

History

The arrondissement of Valenciennes was created in 1800.

As a result of the reorganisation of the cantons of France which came into effect in 2015, the borders of the cantons are no longer related to the borders of the arrondissements. The cantons of the arrondissement of Valenciennes were, as of January 2015:

 Anzin
 Bouchain
 Condé-sur-l'Escaut
 Denain
 Saint-Amand-les-Eaux-Rive droite
 Saint-Amand-les-Eaux-Rive gauche
 Valenciennes-Est
 Valenciennes-Nord
 Valenciennes-Sud

References

Valenciennes
Valenciennes
French Hainaut